Redemptoris may refer to :

Congregatio Sanctissimi Redemptoris is a Roman Catholic missionary Congregation founded in 1732 by Saint Alphonsus Liguori.
Divini Redemptoris was an anti-communist encyclical issued by Pope Pius XI.
Redemptoris Mater is the title of a Mariological encyclical by Pope John Paul II.
Redemptoris Missio is an encyclical by Pope John Paul II published in 1990 on the topic of missions.